The white-crested tiger heron (Tigriornis leucolopha), also known as the white-crested bittern, is a species of heron in the family Ardeidae. It is in the monotypic genus Tigriornis. It is widely distributed across the African tropical rainforest.

References

white-crested tiger heron
Birds of the African tropical rainforest
white-crested tiger heron
Taxonomy articles created by Polbot